Phyteum or Phyteon, also known on as Phytaeum or Phytaion (Φύταιον), was a town of ancient Aetolia, probably on the northern shore of the Lake Trichonis.

Its site is tentatively located near the modern Palaiokhori.

References

Populated places in ancient Aetolia
Former populated places in Greece